The 1937 Detroit Lions season was their eighth in the league. The team failed to improve on their previous season's output of 8–4, winning only seven games. They failed to qualify for the playoffs for the second consecutive season.

Schedule

Note: Intra-division opponents are in bold text.

Standings

References

External links 
1937 Detroit Lions at Pro Football Reference
1937 Detroit Lions at jt-sw.com
1937 Detroit Lions at The Football Database

Detroit Lions seasons
Detroit Lions
Detroit Lions